Irene Lake is a freshwater body of the southeastern part of the Eeyou Istchee James Bay (municipality), in Jamésie, in the administrative region of Nord-du-Québec, in the province of Quebec, in Canada.

This stretch of water extends in the canton of Rasles. Forestry is the main economic activity of the sector. Recreational tourism activities come second.

The hydrographic slope of Lake Irene is accessible through the R1032 forest road (North-South direction) which passes on the west side of the lakes Gabriel and Irene; in addition, this road crosses the Irène River (Opawica River) south of Irène Lake to merge south along route 212 which passes on the south side of the Irène River, connecting Obedjiwan to La Tuque.

The surface of Irene Lake is usually frozen from early November to mid-May, however, safe ice movement is generally from mid-November to mid-April.

Geography

Toponymy
The toponym "lac Irene" was made official on December 5, 1968 by the Commission de toponymie du Québec, when it was created.

Notes and references

See also 

Eeyou Istchee James Bay
Lakes of Nord-du-Québec
Nottaway River drainage basin